Lachlan Nieboer (born 11 September 1981) is an English actor and producer. He is best known for his roles as Lieutenant Edward Courtenay in Downton Abbey, Count Antonio Rossi in The Princess Switch: Switched Again and Cpt. Charles Davenport in the film Into the White, and as executive producer for Shane, the documentary on Australian cricketer, Shane Warne.

Career
Nieboer's first job out of drama school was the role of Gray, Captain Jack Harkness's brother, in the second series of the BBC television series Torchwood. He appeared in the series' final two episodes, "Fragments" and "Exit Wounds".

He played Lieutenant Edward Courtenay in the second series of Downton Abbey. He starred as Captain Davenport in the Norwegian feature film Cross of Honour (originally Into the White), based on a true story. He played Dominic in Mike Figgis's suspense thriller Suspension of Disbelief. He featured briefly as the lothario Ted in Fredrik Bond's Charlie Countryman opposite Shia LaBeouf and Aubrey Plaza.

Nieboer starred in the independent horror film The Unfolding and Identicals. He starred in Trendy, a thriller shot in East London, which premiered in competition at the Raindance Film Festival in 2017.

Nieboer played King Nikolas in Hallmark's Royal Hearts, opposite Jim Brolin.

In November 2020, he played Count Antonio Rossi in the sequel to The Princess Switch, starring Vanessa Hudgens, in The Princess Switch: Switched Again.

Nieboer has also worked at the National Theatre and in various fringe theatres in London.

From 2011–2015, Nieboer starred in the Heineken "Sunrise" campaign with Audrey Napoleon, and the Mercedes-Benz "Sound with Power" campaign, wearing the first ever full LED suit, alongside rapper Tinie Tempah.

Filmography

Film

Television

References

External links

1981 births
Living people
English male film actors
English male television actors
English male stage actors
21st-century English male actors
Male actors from Surrey
People from Epsom